Antonios Papaioannou was a Greek gymnast.  He competed at the 1896 Summer Olympics in Athens. Papaigannou competed in the parallel bars and horizontal bar individual events.  He did not win medals in either competition, though his exact ranking is unknown.

References

External links
 

Year of birth missing
Year of death missing
Gymnasts at the 1896 Summer Olympics
19th-century sportsmen
Olympic gymnasts of Greece
Greek male artistic gymnasts
Place of birth missing
Sportspeople from Patras